Kiryat Menachem Begin, named after former Israeli Prime Minister Menachem Begin and also known as Kiryat HaMemshala, is a complex of government buildings in East Jerusalem located between Sheikh Jarrah in the north, adjacent to Mount Scopus in the east and Ammunition Hill in the west.

Overview
The Kiryat Menachem Begin complex serves as home to several government offices, along with the main government complex in Givat Ram. It also includes the National Headquarters of the Israel Police.

The complex includes the following institutions:

 The Ministry of Public Security
 The Housing and Construction Ministry
 The Science and Technology Ministry

History
Government offices area in East Jerusalem were built after the Six-Day War in 1967 in an area that separated western and eastern Jerusalem. The first building was the National Headquarters of the Israel Police that was inaugurated in 1973, planned by architect Dan Eytan. In the early 1980s, Prime Minister Menachem Begin decided to set up government offices close to the police headquarters. After his death the area was named after him.

See also
 Kiryat Menachem
 Kiryat HaMemshala

References

1973 establishments in Israel
20th century in Jerusalem
Buildings and structures in Jerusalem
Jerusalem Governorate
Mount Scopus
Israeli settlements in East Jerusalem